The Silent Woman is a 1918 American silent drama film, directed by Herbert Blaché. It stars Edith Storey, Frank Mills, and Joseph Kilgour, and was released on September 2, 1918.

Cast list
 Edith Storey as Nan McDonald
 Frank R. Mills as John Lowery
 Joseph Kilgour as Clifford Beresford
 Lila Leslie as Mary Lowery
 Mathilde Brundage as Mrs. Elton
 Baby Ivy Ward as Little Billy
 George S. Stevens as Doctor
 T. Tamamoto as Servant
 Augusta Perry as Maid
 Harry Linson as Lumberjack
 Ben Walker as Lumberjack
 John Cohill as Lumberjack

References

External links 
 
 
 

Metro Pictures films
Films directed by Herbert Blaché
American silent feature films
American black-and-white films
Silent American drama films
1918 drama films
1918 films
1910s English-language films
1910s American films